Nelson Branch is a stream in Dent County in the U.S. state of Missouri. It is a tributary to the Meramec River which it joins approximately six miles northeast of Salem. The stream headwaters arise adjacent to Missouri Route 19 three miles north of Salem and one mile south of the community of Howes.

Nelson Branch has the name of the local Nelson family.

See also
List of rivers of Missouri

References

Rivers of Dent County, Missouri
Rivers of Missouri